The year 595 BC was a year of the pre-Julian Roman calendar. In the Roman Empire, it was known as year 159 Ab urbe condita . The denomination 595 BC for this year has been used since the early medieval period, when the Anno Domini calendar era became the prevalent method in Europe for naming years.

Events
 Psamtik II succeeds Necho II as king of Egypt.
 Beginning of the First Sacred War in ancient Greece.
 The State of Chu defeats the State of Jin in the Battle of Bi.

Births

References